Abu Bakar bin Abdul Jamal was the tenth Chief and the first four-star Admiral of the Royal Malaysian Navy (RMN).

Abu Bakar served for nearly 40 years in the RMN and held various positions and ranks. He was commanding officer of several RMN ship including patrol ship, destroyers (missile) and corvettes. Between 1981 and 1984, bu Bakar was made senior officer for the Corvette Project Team in Kiel, Germany. He later held the position of Assistant Chief of Navy (Human Resource) and Deputy Chief of Navy in 1996. Admiral Abu Bakar became the Chief of Navy on 15 October 1998 and was elevated to the rank of admiral on 1 June 2000. He retired in 2002.

Besides the various Malaysian awards and medals, Abu Bakar was also awarded the Bintang Jalasena Utama by Indonesia and the Legion of Merit (degree of commander) by the United States of America.

Early life
He was born on 13 November 1946 in Johor, Malaysia and received his early education at the Royal Military College in Sungai Besi, Kuala Lumpur. Abu Bakar joined the naval service in 1965 and commenced training as a cadet at the Britannia Royal Naval College, United Kingdom. Abu Bakar was trained in weapons engineering at HMS Excellent School of Weapons Engineering, United Kingdom. He was also trained in Training Technology by the Royal Australian Navy. Abu Bakar is also a graduate of the Royal Naval College, Greenwich, United Kingdom and the Naval Postgraduate School, Monterey, California, where he studied Defence Management. He went on to enrol in a fellowship programme at the Wolfson College, Cambridge and later studied at the Royal College of Defence Studies, United Kingdom.

Family
Abu Bakar is married to Kamariyah binti Buang and they have three children.

Honours
  : 
 Member of the Order of the Defender of the Realm (A.M.N.) (1977)
 Officer of the Order of the Defender of the Realm (K.M.N.) (1982)
 Companion of the Order of the Defender of the Realm (J.M.N.) (1996)
 Commander of the Order of Loyalty to the Crown of Malaysia (P.S.M.) – Tan Sri (2001)

 Knight Companion of the Order of the Crown of Pahang (D.I.M.P.) – Dato' (1991)

 Knight Commander of the Order of Taming Sari (D.P.T.S.) – Dato' Pahlawan (1997)
 Knight Grand Commander of the Order of Taming Sari (S.P.T.S.) – Dato' Seri Panglima (1999)
 Malaysian Armed Forces :
 Courageous Commander of the Most Gallant Order of Military Service (P.G.A.T.) (1999)
 :
 Knight Commander of the Order of the Crown of Johor (D.P.M.J.) – Dato' (1998)
 Knight Grand Commander of the Order of the Crown of Johor (S.P.M.J.) – Dato' (2000)

Foreign honour

 Commander of the Legion of Merit (LOM)

References

External links

Ex-Chief Of RMN|Royal Malaysian Navy Official Website

1946 births
Living people
Admirals
Graduates of the Royal College of Defence Studies
Commanders of the Legion of Merit
Members of the Order of the Defender of the Realm
Officers of the Order of the Defender of the Realm
Companions of the Order of the Defender of the Realm
Commanders of the Order of Loyalty to the Crown of Malaysia
Knights Commander of the Order of the Crown of Johor
Knights Grand Commander of the Order of the Crown of Johor
Graduates of the Royal Naval College, Greenwich
Royal Malaysian Navy personnel
Malaysian people of Malay descent
Naval Postgraduate School alumni
Malaysian expatriates in the United Kingdom